Anyang Station is a ground-level subway station on Line 1 of the Seoul Metropolitan Subway. The station is located in the Anyang One neighborhood, in Manan District, Seoul. The station's sole exit offers access to Enter-6 Mall, which occupies the same building.  Travel time from Anyang Station to Seoul Station on Line 1 is approximately 40 minutes.  Anyang Station is the main station in Anyang, but there are another six stations in Anyang, namely Beomgye, Pyeongchon and Indeogwon on Line 4, and Myeonghak, Gwanak and Seoksu on Line 1, though the latter's platforms lie within Seoul. It is connected with Lotte Dapartment Store.

Station layout

Korail platforms 
Seoul Subway Line 1 · Gyeongbu Line platforms (Ground)

History

Anyang Station opened as a stop-off on the Gyeongbu Line, which it remains today, on January 1, 1905.  On August 15, 1974, services on the Seoul Subway began stopping at Anyang.  The current station building was completed in December 2001, and three years later, on January 20, 2005, express subway services from Seoul to Suwon began calling at Anyang.

Services
The first train of the day weekdays (not including national holidays) is at 5.31 a.m. northbound and 5.17 a.m. southbound, while the last is at 12.12 a.m. northbound and 12.02 a.m. southbound.  Northbound trains have various destinations.  Some terminate at Guro, some at Dongmyo, others at Cheongnyangni, while some continue as far as Kwangwoon University.  None, however, continue beyond Kwangwoon University, so if travel beyond is required, it is necessary to change trains.  Some southbound trains terminate at Byeongjeom, while the remainder continue to Cheonan.

Vicinity
Exit 1 : Manan Elementary
Exit 2 : Yangmyeong High, Daewoo apartment

References

Seoul Metropolitan Subway stations
Metro stations in Anyang, Gyeonggi
Railway stations in Korea opened in 1905